Wellsboro Area High School is a small, rural public high school located at 225 Nichols Street, Wellsboro, Pennsylvania, USA. In 2015, enrollment was reported as 469 pupils in 9th through 12th grades. Wellsboro Area High School employed 38 teachers.

The district also offers Wellsboro Online Academy to pupils permitting K–12 students to opt for an online learning environment, rather than attending the traditional brick and mortar high school building.

The BLaST Intermediate Unit IU17 provides the high school with a wide variety of services like specialized education for disabled students and hearing, background checks for employees, state mandated recognizing and reporting child abuse training, speech and visual disability services and criminal background check processing for prospective employees and professional development for staff and faculty.

Extracurriculars
Wellsboro Area School District offers an extensive extracurricular program, including clubs, arts and an extensive interscholastic athletics program.

Sports
The district funds:

Boys
Baseball - AA
Basketball - AA
Cross country - Class A
Football - A
Golf - AA
Soccer - A
Tennis - AA
Track and field - AA
 Wrestling  - AA

Girls
Basketball - AA
Cross country - Class A
Golf - AA
Soccer - A
Softball - AA
Tennis - AA
Track and field - AA
Volleyball - AA

Middle school sports

Boys
Basketball
Cross country
Football
Soccer
Wrestling 

Girls
Basketball
Cross country
Soccer
Volleyball 

According to PIAA directory July 2015.

References

Schools in Tioga County, Pennsylvania
Education in Lycoming County, Pennsylvania
Public high schools in Pennsylvania